Ayta ash Shab (also transliterated Ayta al-Sha'b, Ayta a-Shaab, Ayta ash-Shab or Ayta ash Sha'b') is a village located in southern Lebanon, about 1 km northeast of the Israeli border.

History

Ottoman era

In 1596, it was named as a village, 'Ayta Bani Salman in the Ottoman nahiya (subdistrict) of  Tibnin  under the liwa' (district) of Safad, with a population of 5 Muslim households. The villagers paid a fixed tax of 25% on  agricultural products, such as wheat, barley,  goats and beehives, in addition to "occasional revenues"; a total of 930 akçe.

In 1875 Victor Guérin noted: "The village has taken the place of a small town surrounded by a wall, of which some remains still exist in well-cut stones and a fort measuring forty paces long by twenty-five broad. Beneath this building lies a large cistern vaulted with circular arches, and built of regularly cut stones. It is covered by a platform, on part of which has been built, later on, a little mosque, now falling into ruins. Here one may remark columns which come from an older building, the site of which is marked by a mass of blocks regularly cut, and by mutilated shafts lying upon the ground.
Below the village, the upper slopes of the hill are cultivated in terraces, and planted with vines, fig-trees, pomegranates, olives, and filberts. Here I found several cisterns, a great sepulchral cave, ornamented with arched arcosolia, each surmounting two sarcophagi, contiguous and parallel, a press with two compartments, one square and the other circular, the whole cut in the living rock.
Ascending towards the east, I passed beside an ancient pool half cut in the rock and half built. Not far is an old evergreen oak, one of the most remarkable that I have seen in Palestine, to which the inhabitants offer a kind of worship. It is protected by a little wall which supports the venerable trunk."

In 1881, the PEF's Survey of Western Palestine (SWP)  described it: A well-built village of stone, situated on hill-top, with figs, olives, and arable land. It contains about 200 Moslems (Guerin says Metawileh), and has water from several cisterns and birket near.
"Here are foundations of walls, built with well-dressed stones. Several sarcophagi were observed. On the east, south and west of village there are also two olive-presses and two rock-cut cisterns."

The ruins of Khirbet Hazireh (Hazzirya) are located 2 km northeast of Ayta ash Shab, described by C.W.M. Van De Velde in 1851.

Modern era

During the 2006 Lebanon War 85% of Ayta ash Shab's homes were destroyed, and heavy ground fighting ensued between Israeli forces and Hezbollah.
On July 20, one civilian in the village was killed by Israeli fire, and three civilian villagers were killed the next day, also by Israeli fire.
Despite repeated attacks the Israeli army was unable to take control of the village and lost 28 soldiers killed in the fighting.

References

Bibliography

External links
Survey of Western Palestine, Map 4: IAA, Wikimedia commons 
 Aayta Ech Chaab, Localiban 

Populated places in the Israeli security zone 1985–2000
Populated places in Bint Jbeil District